Karl Jakob Weber (12 August 1712 – 1764) was a Swiss architect and engineer who was in charge of the first organized excavations at Herculaneum, Pompeii and Stabiae, under the patronage of Charles VII of Naples.  At first a soldier and military engineer, he joined the excavations in 1749.  His detailed drawings provided some of the basis for the luxurious royal folios of Le Antichità di Ercolano esposte, by means of which the European intelligentsia became aware of the details of what was being recovered.

Weber's unwilling collaborator was Roque de Alcubierre, previously in charge of the excavations, whose treasure-hunting technique provided the fine bronzes and other works of art that kept royal patronage stimulated. Alcubierre was jealous of Weber, whose system of excavating whole rooms with a concern for context  makes him a heroic forerunner of today's architectural profession, and attempted to sabotage Weber's work.  On Weber's death, the architect Francisco La Vega was put in charge of excavations.

Weber's plan of the still-buried Villa of the Papyri at Herculaneum, which was being explored room by room by smashing openings through frescoed walls, is still the basis of our understanding of its layout, which was echoed in the construction of the J. Paul Getty Museum, Malibu, California.

Weber was born at Arth in the Schwyz canton of Switzerland, to a family of the Catholic nobility. He was trained at the gymnasium of Lucerne, then travelled to Pavia, Lombardy, pursuing a higher degree in mathematics at the Collegio Ghislieri. Not having a private income in spite of his noble background, he enlisted in a regiment of Swiss mercenaries stationed in the Kingdom of Naples. The remainder of his career was passed in Italy.  After a few years, he took examinations for admission to the corps of military engineers,  and was accepted in the Royal Guard as engineer in 1743, where he joined the forces excavating Herculaneum in late 1749, initially at the request of Alcubierre, the Spanish military engineer who directed the royal excavations.  In addition to the Villa dei Papiri he recovered much of the Theatre at Herculaneum, the Praedia of Julia Felix on the Via dell'Abbondanza at Pompeii, for which he drew up an axonometric plan, and several villas at Stabiae, bringing the first professionalism to the Royal digs.

References 
 Christopher Charles Parslow, 1995. Rediscovering Antiquity: Karl Weber and the Excavation of Herculaneum, Pompeii and Stabiae (Cambridge University Press). Bryn Mawr Classical Review 96.12.10

External links 

 AD79 Year of Destruction

1712 births
1764 deaths
18th-century Italian people
18th-century Swiss people
Italian archaeologists
Italian engineers
Swiss engineers
Swiss-German people
Italian people of Swiss descent
People from the canton of Schwyz